Mississippi Highway 584 (MS 584) is a  state highway in Amite and Pike counties of southern Mississippi, United States. It connects the towns of Liberty and Osyka via Gillsburg.

Route description
MS 584 begins in Amite County in downtown Liberty at an intersection with MS 24/MS 48/MS 569 (Main Street). It heads south through neighborhoods along Gillsburg Road before turning east along Osyka Road to leave Liberty and continue southeast through a mix of farmland and wooded areas for the next several miles, where it crosses a bridge over the East Fork Amite River. The highway then passes through Gillsburg, where it has an intersection with MS 568 and crosses a bridge over the Tickfaw River. MS 584 continues east through rural areas for several miles, where it has it has intersections with MS 571 and MS 923 and comes very close to the Louisiana border, in some areas within less than a mile. It now crosses into Pike County and has an interchange with Interstate 55 (I-55) at its exit 1 shortly before entering Osyka. MS 584 enters the town along Liberty Street and passes southeast through neighborhoods before coming to an end at an intersection with U.S. Route 51 (US 51), just northwest of downtown. The entire route of MS 584 is a two-lane highway.

Major intersections

See also

References

External links

584
Transportation in Amite County, Mississippi
Pike